

This is a list of the National Register of Historic Places listings in Antelope County, Nebraska.

This is intended to be a complete list of the properties on the National Register of Historic Places in Antelope County, Nebraska, United States.  The locations of National Register properties for which the latitude and longitude coordinates are included below, may be seen in a map.

There are 10 properties listed on the National Register in the county, and one former listing.

Current listings

|}

Former listings

|}

See also
 List of National Historic Landmarks in Nebraska
 National Register of Historic Places listings in Nebraska

References

External links

 –Nebraska State Historical Society

 
Antelope